Now That's What I Call the 80s Volume 2 is a special edition compilation album from the (U.S.) Now! series released on June 30, 2009. The album is the series' second compilation of pop music hits of the 1980s. It debuted on the Billboard 200 album chart at number 37.

Most of the tracks on the album are from the latter half of the 1980s. Included in the lineup are nine songs that topped the Billboard Hot 100 from The Human League, Duran Duran, Whitney Houston, Cyndi Lauper, Bruce Hornsby and the Range, George Michael, Rick Astley, Paula Abdul and Martika.

Track listing

See also
 Now That's What I Call the 80s (U.S. series)

References

2009 compilation albums
1980s 02